Mustakivi (Estonian for "Black Stone") is a subdistrict in the district of Lasnamäe, Tallinn, the capital of Estonia. It has a population of 19,759.

References

Subdistricts of Tallinn